Charlotte Mata Rascála (1919–1989) known as Charlotte Yazbek after her husband José Yazbek, was a Mexican sculptor.

Rascála was born in Puebla in 1919 and was of Lebanese descent. She lived with her father since her mother had died early. After an initial marriage and divorce, she met her second husband, Jose Yazbek.

She studied art with Uxio Souto in 1957 and, later, artistic anatomy with Hermilio Castañeda. Some of her other notable teachers were Pedro Medina Guzman and Manuel Giner de los Rios for drawing and painting and Mathias Goeritz in art history.

Her first exhibition was in 1960, and in 1962 she had her first solo show. Mexican president Adolfo López Mateos gave her a commendation in recognition of her 17 sculptures that were placed in the Mexican Pavilion at the 1964 New York World's Fair.

With international acclaim she was able to hold more than 100 exhibitions of her work throughout the world. She was the subject of several books, magazine articles and  a film documentary. She died in 1989, leaving behind a legacy of works that can be found in public places such as the Parque de las Esculturas in Cuautitlán Izcalli and the Charlotte Yazbek Plaza in Mexico City's Bosque de Chapultepec.

References 

 Artspawn. "Biography of Charlotte Yazbek", Biographical information about Charlotte Yazbek at Artspawn.

1919 births
1989 deaths
Mexican women sculptors
Artists from Puebla
Mexican people of Lebanese descent
20th-century sculptors
20th-century Mexican women artists